The 2022 F4 Japanese Championship season was the eighth season of the F4 Japanese Championship. It was competed with 14 races over seven double-header rounds.

Teams and drivers
All teams and drivers were Japanese-registered

Race calendar and results 
All rounds were held in Japan and supported the Super GT events.

Championship standings 
Points were awarded as follows:

Drivers' standings

Independent Cup

Teams' standings 
Only the best finisher scores points for their team.

Notes

References

External links 

  

Japanese F4 Championship seasons
Japanese F4
F4 Japanese Championship
Japanese F4